The Bjørvika Tunnel is a motorway immersed tunnel on European Route E18 in the city center of Oslo, Norway. The tunnel has two bores, with three lanes in each. In the west, it connects to the Festning Tunnel at Akershus Fortress and runs under the Bjørvika arm of the Oslofjord before ending in an intersection on the east shore, where it splits into Mosseveien (E18) and the Ekeberg Tunnel (National Road 190). It was built by the  Norwegian Public Roads Administration The Bjørvika Tunnel is part of the Opera Tunnel complex which is the name of the interconnected system of tunnels between Ryen and Filipstad. The Bjørvika Tunnel is the first immersed tunnel in Norway.

The project will create a  continuous tunnel from Framnes (at the Kiel ferry terminal) to Ryen. The connection with the Festning Tunnel will require a  sinking of the latter, and it will have a basement built under it.

References

Road tunnels in Oslo
Subsea tunnels in Norway
European route E18 in Norway
Fjord City
2010 establishments in Norway
Tunnels completed in 2010